Nancy Rohinton Daruwalla (born 31 August 1987) is a Maharashtrian cricketer. She played for Mumbai and West Zone. She has played 84 limited over and 31 Women's Twenty20 matches.

References 

1987 births
Mumbai women cricketers
West Zone women cricketers
Living people
Parsi people